Neuburgia macroloba is a species of flowering plant in the family Loganiaceae. It is endemic to Fiji, where it is known only from the island of Taveuni. There are six known subpopulations with just a few individuals each. It grows in dense forest habitat.

References

Endemic flora of Fiji
macroloba
Endangered plants
Taxonomy articles created by Polbot